Zinc lactate is a chemical compound, a salt of zinc and lactic acid with the formula Zn(C3H5O3)2.

Synthesis
Reaction of lactic acid with zinc oxide:
 2CH3CH(OH)COOH + ZnO → Zn(C3H5O3)2 + H2O

Physical properties
Zinc lactate appears as a white to almost white fine powder.

Zinc lactate is nearly odourless, highly soluble in water, and insoluble in ethanol.

Zinc lactate forms dihydrates with the chemical formula Zn(C3H5O3)2 • 2H2O.

Use
The compound is used in dental care products like toothpaste or mouthwash.

Can also be used as a dietary ingredient and as a nutrient.

Tha compound has antioxidant properties in mammals and can improve intestinal function.

References

Lactates
Zinc compounds